The Social Democrat Party (PSD) was a political party of Chile founded on 11 September 1967 by the Senator Luis Fernando Luengo and the Deputy Patricio Hurtado Pereira.

History
Luis Fernando Luengo was a member of the National Democratic Party and Patricio Hurtado, had renounced his membership in the Christian Democratic Party to create the Movement of National Rebellion (MORENA) in 1964. The party was one deputy and one senator. For the 1969 elections the party elected one senator but had no deputies. In the presidential elections of 1970 the party supported Salvador Allende and on 11 August 1972 the party was dissolved and its members moved to the Radical Party.

Among its leaders were Lautaro Ojeda, Plácido Contreras, Juan Tuma, Eugenio Tuma, Humberto Martones Morales, Enrique Martones Morales, Gabriel Luengo, Hernán Giles, Manuel Yáñez, the doctor Óscar Jiménez Pinochet, Uberlinda Lagos Reyes, Luis Urra Muena, Francisco González and Manuel González.

References 

Defunct political parties in Chile
Political parties established in 1967
Political parties disestablished in 1972
1967 establishments in Chile
1972 disestablishments in Chile